Lars David Lång, (born 14 November 1972 in Nyhöping's Eastern Parish, Nyköping, Södermanland County) is a Swedish member of the Riksdag for the Sweden Democrats since 2010. He is currently taking up seat number 235 for Örebro County.

He has been a member of the Taxation Committee from October 2010 until January 2010 when he left the Taxation Committee to join the Social Insurance Committee in January 2012. He left the Social Insurance Committee in October 2014 and after the 2014 general election and rejoined the Taxation Committee. He is also a board member for the Sweden Democrats.

Early career 
Lång joined the Sweden Democrats in 1999. During the 2006 general election Lång was chosen to be on the twelfth place for the Sweden Democrat's ballot list. In 2009 he was chosen to be on the Diocese of Stockholm and as a substitute member for the Swedish Church meeting. Since 2014 he is a full member of the Swedish Church meeting.

Lång is also the author behind the Sweden Democrats economic planning program. He is also a host of Radio SD, the Sweden Democrats radio program, and the Sweden Democrats' voice in Stockholm's community radio. Long has studied economics and seems to be one of the party's traditionalists.

In the 2010 general election Lång campaigned for place number 20 on the Sweden Democrats ballot. He ended up being the last person to be elected since the Sweden Democrats received 20 seats in the Riksdag in the 2010 general election. He was elected and served in the Taxation Committee. He later left the Taxation Committee and later represented his party in the Social Insurance Committee after he left the Taxation Committee. He later rejoined the Taxation Committee after the 2014 general elections.

References

External links 
 Radio SD – official web site

Living people
1972 births
People from Nyköping Municipality
Members of the Riksdag from the Sweden Democrats
Members of the Riksdag 2010–2014
Members of the Riksdag 2014–2018
Members of the Riksdag 2018–2022
Members of the Riksdag 2022–2026